Kenneth Lawrence Mitchell Bolonchuk (born February 26, 1952) is a Canadian former ice hockey defenceman.

Born in Winnipeg, Manitoba, Bolonchuk was drafted by the Vancouver Canucks in 1972, Bolonchuk was left unprotected for the 1974 NHL Expansion Draft by the Vancouver Canucks, and was claimed by the Washington Capitals, where he played parts of three seasons until the end of the 1977–78 season. The majority of his career was spent in the International Hockey League, a minor professional league.

In 2010, Bolonchuk was employed as a senior fire prevention officer with the Winnipeg Fire Department.

Career statistics

Regular season and playoffs

References

External links

Profile at hockeydraftcentral.com

1952 births
Living people
Canadian ice hockey defencemen
Ice hockey people from Winnipeg
Seattle Totems (WHL) players
Vancouver Canucks draft picks
Vancouver Canucks players
Washington Capitals players
Dayton Gems players
Hampton Gulls (AHL) players